Jainism emphasises that ratnatraya (triple gems of Jainism) — the right faith (Samyak Darshana), right knowledge (Samyak Gyana) and right conduct (Samyak Charitra) — constitutes the path to liberation. These are known as the triple gems (or jewels) of Jainism and hence also known as Ratnatraya

The Path to liberation 
According to Jainism, purification of soul and liberation can be achieved through the path of three jewels: Samyak darśana (Correct View), meaning faith, acceptance of the truth of soul (jīva); Samyak jnana (Correct Knowledge), meaning undoubting knowledge of the tattvas; and Samyak charitra (Correct Conduct), meaning behavior consistent with the Five vows. Jain texts often add samyak tap (Correct Asceticism) as a fourth jewel, emphasizing belief in ascetic practices as the means to liberation (moksha). The four jewels are called moksha marg. According to Jain texts, the liberated pure soul (Siddha) goes up to the summit of universe (Siddhashila) and dwells there in eternal bliss.

The very first sloka (aphorism) of the Sacred Jain text, Tattvartha sutra reads:

Ācārya Pujyapada writes in Sarvārthasiddhi (translated by Prof. S. A. Jain):

The Three Jewels

Right Faith 

Acharya Umaswami has written in Tattvārthasūtra that Tattvarthasraddhanam Samyak-darshanam (1-2), which means "Belief in substances ascertained as they are is right faith." 

These seven substances also called tattva are:-
jīva- the soul which is characterized by consciousness.
ajīva- the non-soul
āsrava – inflow of auspicious and evil karmic matter into the soul.
bondage (Bandha)- mutual intermingling of the soul and karmas
Samvara (stoppage)– obstruction of the inflow of karmic matter into the soul.
Nirjara– gradual dissociation of karmic matter from the soul
Moksha (liberation)- complete annihilation of all karmic matter (bound with any particular soul)

Many disciplines of knowledge are developed based on certain fundamental givens, or axioms.  For example, Euclidean geometry is an axiomatic system, in which all theorems ("true statements given the axioms") are derived from a finite number of axioms. Special theory of relativity bases itself on one of the fundamental principles called "The Principle of Invariant Light Speed".  It takes it as given that light in vacuum propagates with the constant speed in terms of any system of inertial coordinates, regardless of the state of motion of the light source. These seven fundamental concepts, provide the metaphysical structure of Jain philosophy.

In the human state of existence, right faith acquired from destruction as well as from destruction-cum- subsidence. An intelligent conviction and profound faith in the essential nature of the soul, of matter, and of their mutual relationships, actions and reactions, is a necessary condition for launching upon the path of liberation. Jainism declares that a person with the right faith will have spiritual calmness (Prasanna), desire for liberation from the endless birth-life-death cycles (Samvega), without any attachment or aversion to anything (Nirveda), kindness (Anukampa), and belief in the tattvas (fundamental principles) described just above (āstika).

Jatismaran Jnana
As per the first Anga of Jainism, the Acharanga Sutra, and the Uttaradhyayana Sutra, knowing the soul at experiential level and the ability to know about the past lives (jatismaran gyan) are important characteristics of a person who has attained Samyak darshan, at 4th Gunasthana. 
Some of the main causes of jatismaran-jnana are:
 Uvasantmohanijjam - due to suppression of mohaniya karma (illusionary karma) as was the case with Nami Rajarishi.
 Ajjhavasansuddhi - due to purification of attitude and improving  leshya (the colour-code indicator of purity of soul) as was the case with Mrigaputra. Some individuals acquire jatismaran-jnana through outside influence and others in natural course due to kshayopasham (the process of extinction-cum-suppression) of karmas obstructing that knowledge.
 By listening to the discourses of arihant Tirthankars or kevlis, accomplished sages possessing Avadhi jnana or Manahparyay  jnana, or the scholars of 14 purvas. 
Any of the above means may trigger the awareness of earlier births. This, in turn, reveals with certainty that what transmigrates from and to the said directions is none else but 'I' (the soul that is me). This awareness enhances the spontaneous feelings of right faith in dharma, samveg (yearning for liberation), and vairagya bhavana (detachment from the mundane) and induces the knowledge of separation of soul and body (bhed-gyan).

Right knowledge 
Jain texts mention that knowledge is of five kinds – sensory knowledge, scriptural knowledge, clairvoyance, telepathy, and omniscience. Out of these, sensory knowledge, scriptural knowledge and clairvoyance may also be erroneous knowledge. Most of our knowledge is sensory-based (mati) and based on recorded knowledge developed by our ancestors in the form of books, articles, papers and other medium (sruta). Jain philosophers also include knowledge acquired directly without any medium. This is achieved by removing the karmic veil on the soul.
A person who sees objects illuminated by coloured light may not be able to judge the true colour of the objects. However, the same person viewing these objects illuminated by sunlight will see the true nature of their colours, without difficulty. Similarly, proper knowledge is essential to provide the right guidance to the soul in its journey towards spiritual uplifting.
The Jain theory of knowledge is a highly developed one based on comprehensive apprehension of reality in multitude of view points and relativity.
Anekantavada, which literally means search of truth from different points of view, is the application of the principle of equality of souls in the sphere of thought. It is a Jain philosophical standpoint just as there is the Advaitic standpoint of Sankara and the standpoint of the Middle Path of the Buddhists. This search leads to understanding and toleration of different and even conflicting views.  When this happens, prejudices subside and the tendency to accommodate increases.  The theory of Anekanta is therefore a unique experiment of non-violence at the root.
A derivation of this principle is the doctrine of Syadvada which highlights that every view is relative to its view point. For example, an object may seem heavy when carried on planet earth, yet lightweight when carried on the moon, where gravity is different.  It is a matter of our daily experience that the same object which gives pleasure to us under certain circumstances becomes boring under different situations.  Nonetheless relative truth is undoubtedly useful as it is a stepping stone to the ultimate realisation of reality.  The theory of Syadvada is based on the premise that every proposition is only relatively true.  It all depends on the particular aspect from which we approach that proposition. Jains therefore developed a logic that encompasses sevenfold predication so as to assist in the construction of proper judgement about any proposition.
Syadvada provides Jainas with a systematic methodology to explore the real nature of reality and consider the problem in a non-violent way from different perspectives. This process ensures that each statement is expressed from seven different conditional and relative viewpoints or propositions, and thus it is known as theory of conditioned predication. These seven propositions are described as follows:
1.Syād-asti — "in some ways it is"
2.Syād-nāsti — "in some ways it is not"
3.Syād-asti-nāsti — "in some ways it is and it is not"
4.Syād-asti-avaktavya — "in some ways it is and it is indescribable"
5.Syād-nāsti-avaktavya — "in some ways it is not and it is indescribable"
6.Syād-asti-nāsti-avaktavya — "in some ways it is, it is not and it is indescribable"
7.Syād-avaktavya — "in some ways it is indescribable"

This means, no model of reality is absolute including religious/spiritual/philosophical concepts.  However, each model provides insight into the working of the universe that are useful within the bounds of its framework and therefore useful under certain conditions.

Right conduct 

Right conduct is the application of the knowledge developed, so as to exercise control over our inner desires and reach a stage where there is no attachment or aversion.

Right conduct includes:
 Five kinds of spiritual purity
 Sāmāyika (equanimity),
 penalties for faults arising from inadvertence, or negligence, on account of which one loses equanimity,
 refraining from himsa (injury),
 control of passions, and
 contemplation of one's own soul

 Observance of Mahavratas (five major vows) and seven supplementary vows.

The interesting aspect is that on this path there is a place for every one from the beginner to the most advanced seekers. Further, it encompasses all aspects of human life, namely social, personal, economic and spiritual leading to integrated development of the individual.

Right Faith and Right Knowledge 
Right view and right knowledge are inter-dependent. For instance, when the clouds disappear, both the heat and the light of the sun are manifested simultaneously. Similarly, when right faith is attained by the soul owing to the subsidence, destruction or destruction- cum-subsidence of faith-deluding karmas, right sensory knowledge and right scriptural knowledge are attained by the soul
at the same time by the removal of wrong sensory and wrong scriptural knowledge.

Right Knowledge and Right Conduct 
Right Knowledge must be accompanied by Right conduct which is necessary for the destruction of karmic bonds. Without it there is no release from the cycle of transmigration, i.e., repeated births and deaths. Just like the light from millions of lamps is of no avail to a blind person, studying scriptures alone is of no use to a person who does not apply them.

Stages on the Path to liberation 

Jainism acknowledges that the soul advances to its liberated stage in various steps, called Gunasthana. Jain literature describes these states in detail. The following provides a concise summary on the various statuses of soul on its journey to spiritual advancement.

Awakening - Developing right view
Lowest stage with ignorance, delusion, and with intense attachments and aversions.  This is the normal condition of all souls involved in the samsara, and is the starting point of spiritual evolution.
Indifference to reality with occasional vague memory of spiritual insight.
Fleeting moments of curiosity towards understanding reality.
Awareness of reality with trust developed in the right view, combined with willingness to practice self-discipline. The soul may be able to subdue the four passions, namely anger, pride, deceit and greed.

Developing right view and discipline
5. The soul now begins to observe some of the rules of right conduct with a view to perfecting itself.  With the discipline of introductory or minor vows, the soul starts on the process of climbing the spiritual ladder.
6. Major vows taken up with firm resolve to control passions.  There may be failures due to lack of full control over passions or carelessness.

Developing self discipline and knowledge
7. Intense practice of vows assisted in better self-control and virtually replaced carelessness with spiritual vigilance and vigor.
8. Closer to perfect self-control over actions, higher control over mind, thought and passions with the soul ready for reduction of the effects of conduct-deluding karma.
9. Higher control over removal of passions, and elimination of conduct-deluding karma begins.
10. Complete elimination of all passions except for subtle degree of attachment.

Gaining absolute knowledge and bliss
11. Suppressed passions and lingering conduct-deluding karma may rise to drag the soul to lower stages; fleeting experiences of equanimity.
12. This is the point of no return. All passions as well as conduct-deluding karma are eliminated.  Permanent internal peace achieved.  No new bondage from this point onwards.
13. All inimical karma destroyed. Omniscience achieved and Arihant stage reached. However the perfected soul is still trapped in the physical body (with right knowledge attained).
14. This is the last stage on the Path, and is followed by the soul's destruction of the aghātiā karmas. Those who pass this stage are called siddha and become fully established in Right Faith, Right Knowledge and Right Conduct.

See also 
Three Jewels of Buddhism

References

Citations

Sources 
 
 

 
 
 
 

Jain philosophical concepts